The Downhill competitions of the 2011 IPC Alpine Skiing World Championships was held at Kandahar Banchetta Giovanni N., in Sestriere, Italy on January 16.

Women

Visually Impaired
In the downhill visually impaired, the athlete with a visual impairment has a sighted guide. The two skiers are considered a team, and dual medals are awarded.

Standing

Sitting

Men

Visually Impaired
In the downhill visually impaired, the athlete with a visual impairment has a sighted guide. The two skiers are considered a team, and dual medals are awarded.

Standing

Sitting
Great Britain's Talan Skeels-Piggins did not compete in the Downhill race, as he had a crash in a training run the day before.

References

External links
2011 IPC Alpine Skiing World Championships - Day 1 at ParalympicSportTV's Official YouTube channel

Downhill